Serhiy Kurta (born 30 June 1993 in Zakarpattia Oblast, Ukraine) is a Ukrainian football striker who plays for Prameň Kováčová in the 3. Liga.

Kurta spent some years in the Sportive Youth system in Uzhhorod. He made his debut in the Ukrainian Premier League in a match against Vorskla Poltava entraining in the second half-time on 26 May 2013.

References

External links 

1993 births
Living people
Ukrainian footballers
Ukrainian expatriate footballers
Association football forwards
FC Hirnyk-Sport Horishni Plavni players
FC Hoverla Uzhhorod players
Ukrainian Premier League players
FKM Nové Zámky players
ŠK Prameň Kováčová players
3. Liga (Slovakia) players
4. Liga (Slovakia) players
5. Liga players
Expatriate footballers in Slovakia
Ukrainian expatriate sportspeople in Slovakia
Expatriate footballers in Austria
Ukrainian expatriate sportspeople in Austria
Sportspeople from Zakarpattia Oblast